Henri Michel-Lévy (July 11, 1844 in Passy, France - September 17, 1914 in Paris), was a French impressionist painter.

Biography 
Lévy was the third of the four sons of Michel Lévy and Thérèse Emerique. The family lived in Paris but originated in the Lorraine province in the north-east of France. The father of Henri was a tradesman.

Lévy was a pupil of Félix Barrias (1822-1907) and of Antoine Vollon (1833-1900). Henri Lévy changed his name to Henri « Michel-Lévy » by adding his father's first name to its surname. This was allegedly done to avoid confusion with other homonyms at that time.

Lévy was an artist but also an art collector as can be seen from the works of Watteau, Boucher and Fragonard that were included in his posthumous sale.

His grave is located in the Montmartre Cemetery.

Work 
Henri Michel-Lévy met regularly with French impressionists, in particular Edgar Degas, Édouard Manet and Eugène Boudin from whom he got most probably his modern taste. He was a portraitist and often painted subjects going about their usual business, as often found as a common thread in Impressionist painting.  Lévy is known for Painting of Eugène Boudin (1880) as the famous painter is himself sketching cows in the fields near Honfleur. His subjects are not professionals but rather found in his social circle, like the wife of his friend, Edgar Degas or his own family.

From 1868 to 1886, Henri Michel-Lévy exhibited at the Salon in Paris, where he was awarded "honorable"  mention in 1880 and a third-class medal in 1881. He won a bronze medal at the Exposition Universelle of 1889. He participated in the Salon between 1868 and 1914.

In 1878, he was represented by Edgar Degas in his atelier (see insert picture) on a painting presented at the fourth Impressionist exhibition in 1879. The painting to the right of Michel-Lévy was identified by Theodore Reff as The Regattas, a painting from Michel-Lévy that was photographically documented but whose whereabouts remain unknown. Michel-Lévy and Degas exchanged portraits of each other on that occasion. But soon after Michel-Lévy sells Degas' painting, which irritates Degas who disdainfully comments: "You have done a despicable thing; you knew very well that I couldn't sell your portrait".

In 1885, he painted the portrait of Auguste Guerbois, the owner of Café Guerbois (nearby Place de Clichy) not too far from Montmartre where painters used to meet. Art historian Ronald Pickvance suggested that Michel-Lévy may have been the painter of the portrait, Madame Lévy, which is usually believed to have been painted by Édouard Manet.

As a landscape painter, Henri Michel-Lévy focused on the peasant life away from the romantic views of the time. But a large portion of his exterior paintings dealt with the middle-class life of the 19th century. An example of that is a painting at the beach (Le Pouligen, la plage) that can be found at Museum Baron Martin, Gray, France in a style that is reminiscent of Boudin's work. Similarly, the painting found as background in Degas's portray of Michel-Lévy revisiting the theme of Le Déjeuner sur l’herbe.

Selected paintings 
The following paintings are exposed in museums across France:
 Le Peintre Eugène Boudin peignant des animaux dans la prairie de Deauville (1880) oil on canvas, 22 x 27 cm, Museum of modern art André Malraux - MuMa, Le Havre, France 
 Auguste Guerbois (1885) oil on canvas, 46 x 38 cm, Musée d'Orsay, Paris, France
 La Nourrice oil on canvas, Museum of Fine Arts, Orléans, France
 Ville balnéaire normande (about 1900) oil on canvas, 54.5 x 65 cm, Montebello Villa, Trouville, France
  Le Pouligen, la plage oil on canvas, Baron Martin Museum, Gray, France
 Bateaux sur la grève, Louvre Museum.

References 

Content in this edit is translated from the existing French Wikipedia article at :fr:Henri Michel-Lévy; see its history for attribution.

External links 
 Henri Michel-Lévy on Artnet

19th-century French painters
Impressionist painters
Jewish painters
1844 births
1914 deaths